Bloomington is a suburban city in Hennepin County, Minnesota, on the north bank of the Minnesota River, above its confluence with the Mississippi River,  south of downtown Minneapolis. At the 2020 census, the city's population was 89,987, making it Minnesota's fourth-largest city.

Bloomington was established as a post–World War II housing boom suburb connected to Minneapolis's urban street grid, and is serviced by two major freeways: Interstate 35W and Interstate 494. Large-scale commercial development is concentrated along the I-494 corridor.

Bloomington has more jobs per capita than either Minneapolis or Saint Paul, due in part to the United States' largest enclosed shopping center, the Mall of America. The headquarters of Ceridian, Donaldson Company, HealthPartners, and Toro, and major operations of Pearson, General Dynamics, Seagate Technologies, Express Scripts and Dairy Queen are also based in the city.

The city was named after Bloomington, Illinois.

History

In 1839, with renewed conflict with the Ojibwa nation, Chief Cloud Man relocated his band of the Mdewakanton Sioux from Bde Maka Ska in Minneapolis to an area named Oak Grove in southern Bloomington, close to present-day Portland Avenue. In 1843, Peter and Louisa Quinn, the first European settlers to live in Bloomington, built a cabin along the Minnesota River in the area. The government had sent them to teach the Native Americans farming methods. Gideon Hollister Pond, a missionary who had been following and recording the Dakota language from Cloud Man's band, relocated later that year, establishing Oak Grove Mission, his log cabin. Pond and his family held church services and taught the Dakota school subjects and farming. Passage across the Minnesota River in Bloomington came in 1849 when William Chambers and Joseph Dean opened the Bloomington Ferry. It remained operational until 1889, when the Bloomington Ferry Bridge was built.

After the Treaty of Traverse des Sioux in 1851, the territory west of the Mississippi River, including Bloomington, was opened to settlers. A group of pioneers settled Bloomington, including the Goodrich, Whalon, and Ames families. They named the area Bloomington after the city they were from, Bloomington, Illinois. Most early jobs were in farming, blacksmithing, and flour milling. The Oxborough family, who came from Canada, built a trading center on Lyndale Avenue and named it Oxboro Heath. Today, the Clover Shopping Center rests near the old trading center site and the nearby Oxboro Clinic is named after them. The Baliff family opened a grocery and general store at what is today Penn Avenue and Old Shakopee Road, and Hector Chadwick, after moving to the settlement, opened a blacksmith shop near the Bloomington Ferry. In 1855, the first public school for all children was opened in Miss Harrison's house, with the first school, Gibson House, built in 1859. On May 11, 1858, the day Minnesota was admitted into the union and officially became a state, 25 residents incorporated the Town of Bloomington. By 1880, the population had grown to 820. In 1892, the first town hall was built at Penn and Old Shakopee Road. By then, the closest Dakota to Minneapolis lived at the residence of Gideon Pond.

1900s to 1930s
After 1900, the population surpassed 1,000 and Bloomington began to transform into a city. With rising population came conflict among citizens over social issues. Among the major issues during this period were parents' unwillingness to consolidate the individual schools into a single, larger school, and fear of mounting taxes. By 1900, there were six rural schools spread throughout the territory with over 200 students enrolled in grades first through eighth. In 1917, the school consolidation issue was settled when voters approved the consolidation. A year later, secondary education and school bus transportation began throughout the city. Telephone service and automobiles appeared.

1940s to 1950s
From 1940 to 1960, the city's population increased to nine times that of the population at the turn of the century. During the 1940s, the city's development vision was low-cost, low-density housing, each with its own well and septic system. The rapid population growth was due in part to the post-World War II boom and subsequent birth of the baby boomer generation. In 1947, the first fire station was constructed and equipped at a cost of $24,000 and the Bloomington Volunteer Fire Department was established with 25 members.

The 1950s saw a considerable expansion of the city and its infrastructure, with the city shifting away from its small-town atmosphere and feel. In 1950, because of the increasing population, the first elementary school, Cedarcrest, was built. It was evident that one consolidated school could no longer serve the growing population, and ten new schools were built in this decade to meet the need. In 1952, the first large business, Toro Manufacturing Company, moved to Bloomington. The significance of this can be seen in Bloomington today, which is home to hundreds of businesses of all types.

In 1953, Bloomington changed from a township to a village form of government. This more professional approach to government was accompanied by open council meetings, land use plans, and published budgets. The effects of this new form of government began immediately, first with the formation of the city police department (at a cost of $2 per taxpayer) and then with the first parkland acquisition. Both Bush Lake Beach and Moir Park were established at a cost of one dollar to each residence. Today, about 1/3 of the city's land area is devoted to city and regional parks, playgrounds, and open space. In 1956, the first city land-use plan was initiated with the construction of Interstate 35W and Metropolitan Stadium.

In 1957, Bloomington High School opened at West 88th Street and Sheridan Avenue South.

In 1958, the city changed from a village government to a council-manager form. One of the first policies the council adopted was encouragement of commercial and industrial development, low-cost housing, and shopping centers. Due to the rapid population increase during this time, police and fire departments changed to a 24-hour dispatching system, and the fire department (now with 46 members) converted a garage into the second fire station.

1960s to 1970s
The 1960s saw accelerated school and business growth throughout the city. On November 8, 1960, Bloomington officially became a city as voters approved the city's organizing document, the city charter. The charter provides for a council-manager form of government in which the city council exercises the city's legislative power and determines all city policies (see City of Bloomington Government). In 1965, a second high school, John F. Kennedy High School, was built, and Bloomington High School was renamed Abraham Lincoln High School. In 1967, a second and third official fire station were approved and built to more effectively combat fires in the increasingly large city. In 1968, Normandale State Junior College opened with an initial enrollment of 1,358 students. In 1974, it was renamed Normandale Community College to reflect expanded courses of study.

From 1961 to 1981, Bloomington was home to most of Minnesota's major sports teams. In 1961, after the completion of Metropolitan Stadium in 1956, both the Minnesota Twins and Minnesota Vikings began regular-season play. Though originally built for the American Association Minneapolis Millers, a minor league baseball team, Metropolitan Stadium was renovated and expanded for Major League Baseball and the National Football League. The first Twins game was held on April 21 (Washington 5, Twins 3) and the first Vikings game was held on September 17 (Vikings 37, Chicago Bears 13). On August 21, 1965, The Beatles played Metropolitan Stadium, their only stop ever in the Minneapolis-St. Paul metropolitan area. In 1967, with the expansion of the National Hockey League, the Metropolitan Sports Center was built near Metropolitan Stadium and the Minnesota North Stars began play later that year.

A number of new city buildings were constructed in the 1970s. In 1970, Thomas Jefferson High School, Bloomington Ice Garden rink one, and a fourth fire station were built. In 1971, school enrollment peaked with 26,000 students, and the fire department had grown to a force of 105 men. (In 1974, after a six-hour city council meeting, women were allowed to join the Bloomington Fire Department, but the city's first female firefighter, Ann Majerus Meyer, did not join the department until 1984; she retired in 2013). In 1975, a second rink was added to the Bloomington Ice Garden and a fifth fire station built, with a sixth added in 1979.

1980s to present
 The 1980s brought radical change to Bloomington with the departure of the Twins and Vikings. On September 30, 1981, the last baseball game was played at Metropolitan Stadium (Kansas City Royals 5, Twins 2) as the Twins and Vikings moved to the newly constructed Hubert H. Humphrey Metrodome in downtown Minneapolis for the 1982 season. In 1985, the Bloomington Port Authority purchased the  Met Stadium site and in less than two years approved first site plans for Mall of America. Two years later, groundbreaking took place for the new megamall, and in 1992, it opened to the public. Today, tenants of Mall of America, when combined, constitute the largest private-sector employer in Bloomington, employing about 13,000 people.

In 1993, the Minnesota North Stars moved to Dallas, and a year later the Metropolitan Sports Center was demolished. In 2004, an IKEA store opened on the west end of the former Met Center site. The remainder of the property is planned to be the site for Mall of America Phase II. In May 2006, the Water Park of America opened. It is the country's ninth-largest indoor waterpark.

In 2019, Bloomington passed an ordinance that forbade filming students of Dar Al-Farooq Islamic Center in a public park, which led to a successful lawsuit in the United States Court of Appeals for the Eighth Circuit against the city to reinstate the First Amendment rights of the parties involved. Keith Ellison had previously asked the court to drop the case.

Geography

There are three primary land types in the city. The northeastern part of the city is a sand plain, low hills dominate the western part, and the far south lies within the valley of the Minnesota River.

About a third of the city is permanently reserved for park purposes, including two large natural areas—the Minnesota Valley's wetlands (controlled by the City and the United States Fish and Wildlife Service) and the Hyland Lake Park Reserve (controlled by the Three Rivers Park District).

Water bodies in the city include Bush Lake, Long Meadow Lake, Lake Normandale, Marsh Lake (Hennepin), Nine Mile Creek, Penn Lake and about 100 small lakes and ponds with their wetland habitats.

The city is informally divided by Interstate 35W into "West Bloomington" and "East Bloomington." West Bloomington is mostly residential with newer housing stock, along with multi-story office high-rises along Interstate Highway 494 in the north, whereas East Bloomington contains more industry, destination retail centers, and the majority of Bloomington's less expensive housing. The dividing line may be placed as far west as France Avenue, where the high school attendance boundaries meet.

Economy
The city is home to a large contingent of employers, providing more than 100,000 jobs. Benefiting from its proximity to major transportation routes and the Minneapolis–Saint Paul International Airport, Bloomington is a major hospitality center with nearly 8,000 hotel rooms.

Ceridian, Donaldson Company, the Evangelical Free Church of America, Great Clips, Leeann Chin, HealthPartners, Holiday Stationstores, Highland Bank, Thermo King and Toro have their headquarters in Bloomington.

Top employers

According to the City's 2019 Comprehensive Annual Financial Report, the top employers in the city are:

Other major employers include Express Scripts, Holiday Stationstores, Thermo King Corporation/Ingersoll Rand Inc., and Polar Semiconductor Inc.

Education
ISD 271 has served the K–12 educational needs of the city since the 1960s, with an operating fund revenue of $148.1 million in 2020. Fifteen public schools in Bloomington are operated by the district, governed by a seven-member elected school board, which appointed Superintendent Eric Melbye in 2021. The previous superintendent, Les Fujitake, served from 2006 until 2020. The city's first public charter school, Seven Hills Preparatory Academy, opened in 2006. As many families remain in or continue to move into the city, there has been support for levy increases. In 1999, the then-largest school bond issue in Minnesota history was approved, funding a $107 million school expansion and renovation project.

The district's two high schools are John F. Kennedy High School in the east and Thomas Jefferson High School in the west. The determining boundary for high school attendance runs near the center of Bloomington on France and Xerxes Avenues, though both schools have open enrollment.

Bloomington's third high school, Abraham Lincoln High School (originally Bloomington High School), closed in 1982 and was sold to the Control Data Corporation in the mid-1980s. Bloomington Stadium, next to the former high school, is still used by both Kennedy High School and Jefferson High School for football, lacrosse, and soccer games.

Mindquest, the nation's first online public high school, operated between 1995 and 2003 through the Bloomington Public Schools.

Private schools
 Bloomington Lutheran School is a K–8 Christian school associated with the WELS. The school is near Bloomington Ferry Road and Old Shakopee Road.
 Nativity of Mary School is on Lyndale Avenue. It is associated with the Nativity of Mary Catholic Church and community.
 Bethany Academy provides K–12 Christian Education. Just west of France Avenue on 98th Street, it is interdenominational with representation of over 60 different Christian churches.

Higher education

 Normandale Community College is a two-year college with about 18,000 full- and part-time students, founded in 1968. It is part of the Minnesota State Colleges and Universities (MnSCU) system.
 Northwestern Health Sciences University focuses on alternative health care and patient research, in the areas of chiropractic, acupuncture, oriental medicine, and massage.
 Bethany Global University is a small Christian school focused on missionary preparation.
 Rasmussen University offers more than 70 programs leading to associate degrees, bachelor's degrees, and a variety of certificates and diplomas.

Demographics

2020 census

Note: the US Census treats Hispanic/Latino as an ethnic category. This table excludes Latinos from the racial categories and assigns them to a separate category. Hispanics/Latinos can be of any race.

As of the 2005–07 American Community Survey conducted by the United States Census Bureau, White Americans made up 82.7% of Bloomington's population; of which 80.9% were non-Hispanic whites. Blacks or African Americans made up 6.6% of Bloomington's population. American Indians made up 0.3% of the city's population. Asian Americans made up 5.1% of the city's population. Pacific Islander Americans were nonexistent in the city. Individuals from some other race made up 3.9% of the city's population, of which 0.8% were non-Hispanic. Individuals from two or more races made up 1.4% of the city's population; of which 1.3% were non-Hispanic. In addition, Hispanics and Latinos made up 5.0% of Bloomington's population.

2010 census
As of the census of 2010, there were 82,893 people, 35,905 households, and 21,618 families residing in the city. The racial makeup of the city was 79.7% White, 7.2% African American, 0.4% Native American, 5.9% Asian, 0.1% Pacific Islander, 3.7% from other races, and 3.1% from two or more races. Hispanic or Latino of any race were 6.8% of the population. East Bloomington is notably more diverse than West Bloomington.

There were 35,905 households, of which 24.7% had children under the age of 18 living with them, 46.6% were married couples living together, 9.7% had a female householder with no husband present, 3.9% had a male householder with no wife present, and 39.8% were non-families. Of all households 32.2% were made up of individuals, and 12.2% had someone living alone who was 65 years of age or older. The average household size was 2.28 and the average family size was 2.89.

The median age in the city was 42.7 years. 19.7% of residents were under the age of 18; 7.9% were between the ages of 18 and 24; 25.1% were from 25 to 44; 28.9% were from 45 to 64; and 18.4% were 65 years of age or older. The gender makeup of the city was 48.4% male and 51.6% female.

Of the 19.7% of the population under 18, much of the young population is considerably more diverse than the mostly white adult population.

Government and politics

Politics

Bloomington is governed by a seven-member part-time city council. Members include the mayor and six council members, of whom four are elected from districts and two elected at-large. Members are elected to four-year terms, except during redistricting when all district council members have a two-year term. Elections are nonpartisan and since 2021 have been conducted by ranked-choice voting after more than 51% of voters voted yes on a ballot question on the topic.

City operations are controlled by three interrelated entities: the City itself, the Port Authority, and the Housing and Redevelopment Authority (HRA). The Port Authority is responsible for managing development in the South Loop district, in the easternmost part of the city, where the Mall of America is. The HRA handles low-income housing in the city and manages the city's redevelopment activities. Membership on the boards of the Port Authority and HRA is controlled by the City Council.

The city's organizing document, the City Charter, was approved by voters on November 8, 1960.
For a list of city mayors (past and present) see List of mayors of Bloomington, Minnesota

Municipal services
The Bloomington Fire Department is one of Minnesota's largest remaining volunteer fire departments, operates out of six fire stations, and uses the latest in fire-fighting equipment. The department has 30 fire-fighting vehicles, including pumpers, hook and ladders, specialty units (one vehicle compact enough to navigate the Mall of America's parking ramps), and spares, all of which are equipped with Opticom System equipment, which automatically switches traffic signals to expedite emergency runs. The average response time is four minutes.

Public safety is protected by Bloomington's 120-officer police force. The officers have Ford Police Interceptor squad cars. Each contains a computer-assisted dispatching center that contains a computerized records system, mobile digital terminals that allow officers direct access to warrant information and state motor vehicle and driver's license records, and Opticom System equipment, which automatically switches traffic signals. The police force is also supported by six canine teams: four dual-purpose patrol dogs, a single-purpose narcotics dog, and a single-purpose explosives-detection dog assigned to the Mall of America. The police department has one of Minnesota's four bomb squads and a 20-member SWAT team.

Federal representation
Bloomington is in Minnesota's 3rd congressional district, represented by Democrat Dean Phillips in the U.S. House of Representatives. In the U.S. Senate, Minnesota is served by Democrats Tina Smith and Amy Klobuchar.

Transportation
The Metro Blue Line, a light rail line, runs between the Mall of America in Bloomington and downtown Minneapolis. The Metro Red Line, a bus line, runs between the Mall of America in Bloomington and Apple Valley, Minnesota. Bloomington is also served by the Minneapolis–Saint Paul International Airport. Additionally, the Metro Orange Line, a bus line that runs between Burnsville, Minnesota and downtown Minneapolis, finished construction in 2021 and travels through Bloomington on Interstate 35W.

Arts and media

Museums
The Works is an experiential technology learning museum for youth.

The Bloomington History Museum focuses on the history of Bloomington, ranging from the prehistoric period through the present day.

The NWA History Museum documents the history of Northwest Airlines.

Theater
Artistry is a professional theater and visual arts nonprofit that produces musicals and plays in the 366-seat Schneider Theater at the municipally owned and operated Bloomington Center for the Arts.

The Theater program at Normandale Community College presents five productions during the academic year.

The high school theater companies at Jefferson and Kennedy each stage three full length productions, a one-act, and a combined fifth production in the summer, annually.

Visual arts
Artistry curates two galleries in the Bloomington Center for the Arts.

Mhiripihri Gallery features Zimbabwean sculpture in a  gallery.

Major public art works
Noted muralist Erik Pearson's 2007 work "Creating Together" adorns the flyloft of the theater at Bloomington Center for the Arts. Pearson also created the mural "Science and Nature" in the city's South Loop district.

2015 also marked the unveiling of "Convergence", by sculptor James Brenner

In 2018, the Wright's lake park mural was completed. It was partially designed and inspired by students from Valley View Middle School, from a gifted program called Nobel, focused on creativity.

Television
Comcast provides access to four Bloomington cable television stations for Public, educational, and government access (PEG) programming. They include The Bloomington Channel 14, a comprehensive source of Bloomington information and programming. The Government-access television (GATV) channel features City Council and school board meetings, a weekly news magazine show called "Bloomington Today", "Roll Call", a weekly update on public safety news produced by the Bloomington Police Department, arts events, and sports. Bloomington Educational Community Television (BEC-TV) highlights educational and school-based programs from the Bloomington's public and private schools. Programming on this channel includes Educational-access television content, concerts, choir shows, graduations, and sporting events. Two student produced shows are also on BEC-TV. Tomorrow's Voices Today (TVT) is a teen news show that highlights the good things teens are doing around the city and talks about teen related issues. YRU-Up was a late night call-in Public-access television cable TV talk show, airing from 1991 to 2017. Skits for the show were produced by students and the show was live every Friday night (Sat. Morning) at 12:30am on TBC (Channel 14). A third channel, BCAT, (Bloomington Cable Access Television) is a Public-access channel that allows individuals and organizations to learn video production and create television shows. The schedules for these channels can be found on a channel called the B.R.A.I.N. The PEG channels are funded by Cable television franchise fees collected in the city.

Film
Parts of the Coen brothers film A Serious Man were filmed in an East Bloomington neighborhood. The neighborhood was chosen for its original suburban ranch-style houses and young trees (due to a storm knocking older ones down), giving it a 1960s new-development look.

Sports and recreation

Hyland Park includes both a ski area and Nordic ski jumps. The ski jumps are maintained by the Minneapolis Ski Club Minneapolis Ski Club and are some of the most urban ski jumps in the U.S. Several U.S. Olympic ski jumpers have come from this ski club. The Minneapolis Ski Club hosted the 2013 Junior National competition. The city also operates the Bloomington Ice Garden (BIG), which contains three ice rinks, one of which is Olympic-size and the other of which has a capacity of 2,500. It appeared in the film Miracle, with the team practicing there before the Olympics. During the winter, the Parks and Recreation Department creates 10+ outdoor skating rinks.

Bloomington was the point of growth for pickleball in Minnesota, beginning about 2005 when retirees brought the sport back from their southern-states retirement homes. From the Westwood Athletic Fields in southern Bloomington, other groups formed and grew to an active statewide player population in excess of 1,500.  Bloomington is also the home of Pickleball Minnesota, the Pickleball website serving the state and the Upper Midwest.

Bloomington has two major sports complexes. Dred Scott Playfields, named after Dred Scott, is on the far West side and contains a variety of recreational activities, including baseball, softball, football, sand volleyball, tennis, and basketball. Also within the complex are an outdoor batting cage and a miniature golf course that are privately owned. Valley View Playfields on the East side contains softball and baseball fields, bocce ball courts, and the Bloomington Family Aquatic Center. Bush Lake Beach (BLB) is on Bush Lake and is open in the summer to recreational swimmers.

Notable people
 Cole Aldrich, University of Kansas center and NBA player
 Lyle G. Abeln, Minnesota state legislator and educator
 William V. Belanger Jr., Minnesota state legislator and businessman 
 Tom Burnett, one of the passengers aboard United Airlines Flight 93
 Kelly Carlson, actress and model
 Ben Clymer, retired NHL player
 Mike Crowley, retired NHL player
 Joseph Cure, ice hockey player and actor (Miracle).
 Pete Docter, film director, animator, screenwriter, producer, and voice actor, known for Monsters, Inc. and Up
 Verne Gagne, former professional wrestler and member of the WWE Hall of Fame
 Tom Gilbert, NHL player, grew up in Bloomington and attended Jefferson High School,
 Bud Grant, retired pro football player and coach. Head coach of Minnesota Vikings from 1967–1985
 Joseph P. Graw, Minnesota state legislator and businessman
 Tim Harrer, retired NHL player
 Julia Hart, Professional Wrestler for All Elite Wrestling (AEW)
 Joyce Henry, Minnesota state legislator
 John Himle, Minnesota state legislator
 Kent Hrbek, retired Minnesota Twins player
 Kyle Jacobs, country music songwriter and husband to Kellie Pickler
 Erik Johnson, NHL player for the Colorado Avalanche, also for Team USA during the 2010 Winter Olympics
 Lane Kiffin, head coach of University of Mississippi (Ole Miss)
 Lloyd Lee, former Chicago Bears linebackers coach
 Mark P. Mahon, Minnesota state legislator
 Frank Moe, Minnesota state legislator and educator
 Peter Mueller, NHL player for the Florida Panthers
 Tony Oliva, retired Minnesota Twins player
 Zach Parise, NHL player for the New York Islanders, former player for the Minnesota Wild
 Mark Parrish, retired NHL player
 Tom Pederson, retired NHL player
 Ryan Peterson, retired NHL player
 Remo Drive, alternative rock band
 Steve Rushin, former Sports Illustrated columnist
 Bryan Schmidt, AHL and DEL player
 Donny Schmit, 1990 125cc and 1992 250cc Motocross World Champion
 Jenna Smith, University of Illinois Women's basketball and WNBA Washington Mystics
 Warren Spannaus, former Minnesota Attorney General
 Ryan Stoa, NHL player for the Washington Capitals
 Milt Sunde, retired NFL player who played for the Vikings; graduate of Bloomington Lincoln
 Paul Thissen, 58th Speaker of the Minnesota House of Representatives and Minnesota Supreme Court Justice
 Dan Trebil, retired NHL player
 Melissa Wiklund, state senator

References

External links

 City of Bloomington official website
 Bloomington Convention and Visitors Bureau
 Bloomington Historical Society

 
1843 establishments in Iowa Territory
Cities in Hennepin County, Minnesota
Cities in Minnesota
Populated places established in 1843